Easy is the 1974 album by British Folk musician Ralph McTell. Guest musicians include folk pioneers Wizz Jones, Bert Jansch and Danny Thompson from Pentangle; Gerry Conway from Fotheringay; and Dave Mattacks from Fairport Convention. McTell started writing for the album at a friend's cottage in a tiny hamlet near the village of St Ewe, Cornwall. He fell in love with Cornwell and purchased a derelict cottage which he made habitable
and still possessed 30 years later.

Things were going well with the recording when Tony Visconti’s manager tried to get McTell to sign with his “Rare Earth” production company. McTell's manager was his brother, Bruce, and he thought it a bad idea, this resulted in Visconti being taken off the record. Danny Thompson and McTell finished the production. The cover painting was by Enrica Y Auque Serra. It was one of a pair of popular Victorian prints popularly known as "Morning" and "Evening".

Track listing
All tracks composed by Ralph McTell 

Side One
"Take It Easy" - 2:32
"Maddy Dances" - 2:15  
"Maginot Waltz" - 3:24
"Sweet Mystery" - 2:32 
"Stuff No More" - 3:15

Side Two
"Run Johnny Run" - 4:15
"Zig Zag Line" - 3:40
"Let Me Down Easy" - 3:13
"Would I Lie to You?" - 3:20
"Summer Lightning" - 2:38

Personnel
Ralph McTell - acoustic guitars (1-10), lead vocals (1-10), banjos (7), harmonium (3), harmonica (5,7)
Wizz Jones - guitar (1)
Bert Jansch - guitar (6)
Danny Thompson - double bass (1-2,4-6,8-10), bass drum (5), hi-hat (5)
Steve Bonnett - mandolin (1,2)
Mike Piggott - fiddle (4)
Lynsey Scott - fiddle (1)
Dave Mattacks - drums (1,2)
Gerry Conway - drums (4,6,9)
Michael Bennett - backing vocals (1)
John Kongos - backing vocals (6)

Production
Producers: Ralph McTell, Danny Thompson and Tony Visconti
Recording Engineers: Phil Dunne, John Kongos, Mike Noble, Victor Gamm and Tony Visconti
John Ashcroft - art direction, typography
Enrica Y Auque Serra - cover painting

Awards and accolades
"Easy" reached number 31 in the UK Album Chart soon after its release in March, 1974.
"Easy" was awarded a Silver disc for record sales in August, 1976.

Release history

Track variations

The UK 1999 CD release includes two bonus tracks taken from a single released in 1972:
 "Teacher Teacher" (Ralph McTell)
 "Truckin' Little Baby" (Blind Boy Fuller)

References

Ralph McTell albums
1974 albums
Albums produced by Tony Visconti
Reprise Records albums